"Kites" is a ballad written by Hal Hackady and Lee Pockriss. It was first recorded by the Rooftop Singers as their last single in 1967.

The song then became a hit for Simon Dupree and the Big Sound, a group of the Shulman brothers, who went on to form the progressive rock band Gentle Giant. Their first releases had not been successful and they looked to their manager, John King, for inspiration. He suggested "Kites", which he had obtained from Robbins' Music. It was not their preferred style but King insisted.

The song was recorded at Abbey Road using unconventional instruments such as a wind machine and included a spoken interlude in Chinese, composed of "sweet nothings" and performed by the actress Jacqui Chan, a friend of the band. The spoken words are in Mandarin, a language which she did not usually speak. One translation is: "I love you, I love you, My love is very strong. It flies high like a kite before the wind, Please do not let go of the string."

The single reached number 8 in the UK Singles Chart in late 1967 and, as an example of the early psychedelic rock style, it has since appeared on many compilations, especially those themed around psychedelia. Music historian Paul Stump called it "one of the first pop singles to employ a bank of keyboards simultaneously for melodic and colouristic purposes". The specific keyboards featured are organ, mellotron, piano, and vibraphone.

References

External links
 Simon Dupree & The Big Sound

1967 songs
1967 singles
Songs written by Lee Pockriss
The Cyrkle songs
Parlophone singles
Macaronic songs